Agra Cantonment (station code: AGC) is the main railway station in the Indian city of Agra. It is located near the Sadar Bazaar towards the southwest of the city. It lies on the main Delhi–Chennai and one of the Delhi–Mumbai lines.

Overview
Agra, the 16-17th century capital of the Mughals, is home to monuments such as the Taj Mahal and the Agra Fort. The Taj Mahal attracts 7-8 million tourists annually. About 0.8 million foreign tourists visit it.

History
The -wide metre-gauge Delhi–Bandikui and Bandikui–Agra lines of Rajputana State Railway were opened in 1874. The Agra–Jaipur line was converted to  broad gauge in 2005.

The broad-gauge Agra–Delhi chord was opened in 1904.

Electrification
The Faridabad–Mathura–Agra section was electrified in 1982–85, Tundla–Yamuna Bridge in 1988–89 and Yamuna Bridge–Agra in 1990–91.

The station
Agra Cantt railway station has 6 platforms:
 Platform 1 = 540 meters
 Platform 2 = 598
 Platform 3 = 573
 Platform 4 = 735
 Platform 5 = 631
 Platform 6 = 320
 Platform 7 = Proposed on 24 Jan 2018

The fastest train in India, Gatimaan Express, originates and terminates here. It was extended to Jhansi in April 2018.

Passenger movement
Agra Cantonment is among the top hundred booking stations of Indian Railway.

1,34,26,890 Passengers Arrive at Agra Cantt per/year on an average.

Amenities
Agra Cantt. railway station has tourist information counter, computerized reservation counters, (Indrail Passes are available), waiting room, retiring room, vegetarian and non-vegetarian refreshment rooms, water coolers, water wending machines and book stall.

Taxis, auto-rickshaws, tempos and cycle-rickshaws are available for local movement. Idgah Bus Stand is nearby. Distance from Agra Cantt. railway station: Taj Mahal 5.7 km, Agra Fort 5.2 km, Sikandra 9.7 km, Fatehpur Sikri 38 km, Agra airport 3.6 km.

Gallery

References

External links 
 

Railway stations in Agra
Agra railway division
1904 establishments in India